Orekhovy is an island in Russia, situated in Lake Ladoga and located at the confluence of Ladoga and the River Neva, at the town of Schlisselburg in the Leningrad region. The island is the site of the medieval Shlisselburg Fortress, where Sweden and Novgorod signed the Treaty of Nöteborg in 1323. In Russian, Finnish, and Swedish, the name means 'nut island'.

Sources 

Islands of Leningrad Oblast